Vozdvizhenskoye is a rural locality (a village) in Yurovskoye Rural Settlement, Gryazovetsky District, Vologda Oblast, Russia. The population was 21 as of 2002.

Geography 
Vozdvizhenskoye is located 26 km southwest of Gryazovets (the district's administrative centre) by road. Kurazh is the nearest rural locality.

References 

Rural localities in Gryazovetsky District